Pound of Ground  is an action game developed by Centauri Production and published by Akella on December 9, 2009. It is a story-driven shoot 'em up around saving the city from danger and making things right again.

Reception
IGN listed off a series of weaknesses of the game including its: "unlikeable characters", "unimaginative quest goals", "bland action", "disposable story scenes", and "awful voice acting", ultimately deeming it disposible. Absolute Games offered a mixed review, citing that while the story was interesting, its gameplay let it down.

References

2009 video games
Video games developed in the Czech Republic
Windows games
Windows-only games
Akella games